The Globe Building is an Art Deco style office and data center building in Downtown St. Louis, Missouri. Before that it housed the St. Louis Globe-Democrat newspaper and was originally built for the Illinois Terminal Railroad. It is listed on the National Register of Historic Places.

The Globe Building was originally designed as a freight and passenger terminal for the Illinois Terminal Railroad. The railroad commissioned the firm Moran, Russell, and Crowell, which designed many large buildings and landmarks in St. Louis. During World War II the building housed offices of the predecessor to the Defense Mapping Agency (DMA), which referenced it as their US Aeronautical Chart Plant, St. Louis. The building would later go on to house geographic data and information firms, including geospatial intelligence offices, which complement the nearby National Geospatial-Intelligence Agency (NGA) Campus West (NCW). The construction of a SCIF (sensitive compartmented information facility), which was novel for a private facility not already under federal contract, was publicly announced in May 2022 at which time it was also claimed that a waiting list of companies seeking placement in the Globe Building exceeds fifty. With the decline of railroads in the United States, in the 1950s the building was transitioned to hosting the fledgling daily newspaper, the St. Louis Globe-Democrat. As newspapers also declined and St. Louis became a single major daily newspaper town in the 1980s, the structure was eventually turned into an office and data center building. The modern day Globe Building is adjacent to what became the Washington Avenue Historic District and is near the complex housing America's Center and The Dome at America's Center. Some elements from the building from the railroad and newspaper eras were salvaged for preservation by the National Building Arts Center.

See also 
 Architecture of St. Louis
 National Register of Historic Places listings in Downtown and Downtown West St. Louis

References

External links 
 Globe Building website
 Emporis profile

Downtown St. Louis
Office buildings in St. Louis
Commercial buildings in Missouri
Art Deco architecture in Missouri
Rail in St. Louis
National Register of Historic Places in St. Louis
Commercial buildings on the National Register of Historic Places in Missouri
Office buildings on the National Register of Historic Places in Missouri
Military facilities on the National Register of Historic Places in Missouri
Railway buildings and structures on the National Register of Historic Places in Missouri
1932 establishments in Missouri